Georgina Fisher (born 30 September 1998) is a full-time English netball player.  She plays in the ANZ Premiership for the New Zealand team Southern Steel.  She was a member of the Wasps Netball squad which won the UK Superleague in 2018, and represented England in the 2018 Sunshine Series against Jamaica and the 2018 Fast5 Netball World Series in Melbourne.

Fisher was born in Hertfordshire.
She was a part of the England netball program at the age of 14, and joined the England under 17 team in 2014.
She joined the Hertfordshire Mavericks in 2016, then represented Wasps Netball for two seasons, before returning to the Mavericks for the 2019 Superleague season.

Fisher was one of the 21 players awarded a full time netball contract ahead of the 2019 Netball World Cup. In September 2020 Fisher announced that she would be joining Southern Steel for the 2021 ANZ Premiership season.

Personal life
Fisher announced her engagement to Southland Sharks player Brayden Inger in September 2022.

References

Living people
1998 births
Place of birth missing (living people)
English netball players
Netball Superleague players
ANZ Premiership players
Mavericks netball players
Wasps Netball players
Southern Steel players
English expatriate netball people in New Zealand